Echinscus clavispinosus is a species of tardigrade in the family Echiniscidae. The species is endemic to the Cape Verde Islands and is found only in the island of Santo Antão. The species was first described by Paulo Fontoura, Giovanni Pilato and Oscar Lisi in 2011.

References

clavispinosus
Endemic fauna of Cape Verde
Invertebrates of Cape Verde
Fauna of Santo Antão, Cape Verde
Animals described in 2011
Taxa named by Paulo Fontoura
Taxa named by Giovanni Pilato
Taxa named by Oscar Lisi